Classics is Ali Project's first mini album, released on July 25, 2001.

Track listing

References

2001 EPs
Ali Project albums
Japanese-language EPs